The Special Organization, a secret paramilitary organization tied to the Committee of Union and Progress (CUP), the ruling party of the Ottoman Empire, included the following members according to an interview with its former leader Eşref Kuşçubaşı by U.S. INR officer Philip H. Stoddard:

References 

Special Organization (Ottoman Empire)